Arthur Rose Sr. (May 26, 1921 - February 13, 1995) was an American painter, sculptor, and professor.  He has been featured in many publications and public exhibitions in the United States.

Biography 
Rose was African-American.
Arthur Rose Sr. was born in Charleston, South Carolina on May 26, 1921.

World War II Service 

In November 1942, he enlisted in the Navy, serving until December 6, 1945, when he was honorably discharged.

Education 

Rose graduated cum laude from Claflin University in 1950, becoming the second student in the school's history to earn a degree in art.  Wanting to further his education, Rose attended New York University and studied under several noted artists, including Hale Woodruff, earning his Master's Degree in 1952.

Teaching years 

In 1952 Rose returned to Claflin, helping to establish that school's Department of Art, and served as its Chair through 1976.  In 1977, he transferred to Voorhees College, becoming that school's Artist in Residence, continuing to teach through 1991.  Many students under his tutelage were poor.  Not only would Rose invite them to his home for meals, but would provide them art supplies.  Many of his students would go on to successful art and teaching careers of their own.  One of them, Leo Twiggs, would help establish the art program and museum at South Carolina State College.

An art museum has been established in his name at Claflin.

He had four children: Patricia A. Rose (deceased), Arthur Rose Jr., Bernard H. Rose, and Marcia L. Rose.

References 

Author Rose The Johnson Collection, LLC (Spartanburg, SC)
http://www.greenville.k12.sc.us/gvilleh/news/Blair%20Wim%20Catalogue%20Essay.doc

External links
Arthur Rose Museum

1921 births
1995 deaths
New York University alumni
African-American academics
20th-century American sculptors
American male sculptors
20th-century American painters
20th-century American male artists
American male painters
Academics from South Carolina
United States Navy sailors
20th-century African-American painters
African-American United States Navy personnel
African Americans in World War II